Uncial 094 (in the Gregory-Aland numbering), ε 016 (Soden); is a Greek uncial manuscript of the New Testament, dated paleographically to the 6th-century.

Description 

The codex contains only a small part of the Gospel of Matthew 24:9-21, on one parchment leaf (30 cm by 24 cm). The text is written in two columns per page, 20 lines per page, in a large uncial letters. It is a palimpsest. The upper text is in Greek. It contains menaeon (see Uncial 0120, Uncial 0133). 

The Greek text of this codex is a representative of the Alexandrian text-type. Aland placed it in Category II.

Currently it is dated by the INTF to the 6th-century.

It was discovered in Saloniki.

Currently the codex is housed at the Εθνική Βιβλιοθήκη (Or. 2106) at Athens.

See also 

 List of New Testament uncials
 Textual criticism

References

Further reading 

 Daniel Serruys, „Catalogue des manuscrits conserves au gymnase grec de Salonigue”, Revue des bibliothèques, Jhg. 18, Nr. 1-4, Paris Jan.—Apr. 1903.
 C. R. Gregory, Textkritik des Neuen Testamentes III (Leipzig: 1909), pp. 1063–1065.

Greek New Testament uncials
6th-century biblical manuscripts
Palimpsests
Manuscripts of the National Library of Greece